Destination: Treasure Island is an adventure game released in 2006. Developed by Kheops Studio and published by Nobilis. The game comes from the creators of The Secrets of Da Vinci, Return to Mysterious Island, Voyage and many more.

Gameplay

Plot

Characters
Jim Hawkings was only a child in Robert Louis Stevenson's 1883 novel, Treasure Island. But now, four years after the events in the novel, Jim has become a fully grown teenager. Treasure Island ends with Jim returning to England. He uses his share of the treasure to buy his mother a small estate. Jim has become an upstanding adventurous young man, attentive to those around him. His taste for adventure soon sets him on his travels again. With the money remaining, he buys a small boat and leaves England for the West Indies.

Captain Flint is a parrot. Faithful to the memory of its master, Captain Flint helps Jim in his quest and delivers useful information. The parrot shows up in different places on the island, always ready to make a sardonic but humorous comment on the player's actions.

Long John Silver is an acquaintance of Jim, and a colorful character. After he betrayed his fellow pirates, he managed to escape the Royal Guard and flee to a secret island with a good amount of the plunder.

The Pirates in the game are Morgan, Dick, Yellow Dog and others. All these men hate Long John, who was their leader and yet betrayed them to save his own skin. Rescued by a passing ship several years later, they have but one goal in life: find Long John to kill him.

Synopsis
Four years have passed since the end of the adventure recounted in Robert Louis Stevenson's novel. Jim Hawkins has become an upstanding adventurous young man, attentive to those around him. Imagine his surprise when, one morning, he sees a parrot enter his bedroom window : none other than Captain Flint, Long John's own companion. The bird brings him a message from his master. In the message the old pirate announces that he has buried a marvelous treasure on the secret isle where he retired : Emerald Island. Jim is going to have to hurry though. Pirates, old enemies of Long John, are on his trail.

Development

Reception 
The game received a rating of 74/100 on Metacritic, based on reviews from 11 critics.

GameSpot reviewer Brett Todd didn't think the game was innovative, though thought it was logical and fun. Jason Flick of Game Chronicles gave particular praise to the game's unique "invention" system.

Destination: Treasure Island was a nominee for GameSpot's 2007 "Best Adventure Game" award, which ultimately went to Zack & Wiki: Quest for Barbaros' Treasure.

References

External links
Destination: Treasure Island at Kheops Studio
Destination: Treasure Island for Mac at Coladia
Destination: Treasure Island at MobyGames

2006 video games
Adventure games
MacOS games
Video games about pirates
Video games based on Treasure Island
Video games developed in France
Video games set in the Caribbean
Windows games
Kheops Studio games